Fort Pillow may refer to:
Fort Pillow State Historic Park, Tennessee, U.S.
Battle of Fort Pillow, 1864
Fort Pillow naval battle, 1862
Cold Creek Correctional Facility, formerly Fort Pillow State Prison and Farm, Tennessee, U.S.

See also
Pillow fort